Obesotoma is a genus of sea snails, marine gastropod mollusks in the family Mangeliidae.

Species
Species within the genus Obesotoma include:
 Obesotoma cymata (Dall, 1919)
 Obesotoma gigantea (Mörch, 1869)
 Obesotoma gigas (Verkrüzen, 1875)
 Obesotoma hokkaidoensis (Bartsch, 1941)
 Obesotoma iessoensis (Smith E. A., 1875)
 Obesotoma japonica Bartsch, 1941
 Obesotoma laevigata (Dall, 1871)
 Obesotoma okutanii Bogdanov & Ito, 1992
 Obesotoma oyashio Shikama, 1962
 Obesotoma pulcherrima Bogdanov & Ito, 1992
 Obesotoma robusta (Packard, 1866)
 Obesotoma sachalinensis Bogdanov, 1989
 Obesotoma simplex (Middendorf, 1849)
 Obesotoma solida (Dall, 1887)
 Obesotoma starobogatovi Bogdanov, 1990
 Obesotoma tenuilirata (Dall, 1871)
 Obesotoma tomiyaensis (Otuka, 1949)
 Obesotoma tumida (Posselt, 1898)
 Obesotoma uchidai Habe, 1958
 Obesotoma woodiana (Møller, 1842)
 Species brought into synonymy 
 Obesotoma hanazakiensis Habe, 1958: synonym of Oenopota hanazakiensis (Habe, 1958)
 Obesotoma miona (Dall, W.H., 1919): synonym of Propebela miona (Dall, W.H., 1919)
 Obesotoma schantarica Middendorff, 1849: synonym of Oenopota schantaricum (Middendorf, 1849)

References

 Gofas, S.; Le Renard, J.; Bouchet, P. (2001). Mollusca, in: Costello, M.J. et al. (Ed.) (2001). European register of marine species: a check-list of the marine species in Europe and a bibliography of guides to their identification. Collection Patrimoines Naturels, 50: pp. 180–213

External links
 P Bartsch. "The Nomenclatorial Status of Certain Northern Turritid Mollusks"; Proceedings of the biological Society of Washington 54, 1-14, 1941
  Tucker, J.K. 2004 Catalog of recent and fossil turrids (Mollusca: Gastropoda). Zootaxa 682:1-1295.
 Worldwide Mollusk Data base : Mangeliidae 
  Gulbin, Vladimir V. "Review of the Shell-bearing Gastropods in the Russian Waters of the East Sea (Sea of Japan). III. Caenogastropoda: Neogastropoda." The Korean Journal of Malacology 25.1 (2009): 51-70

 
Gastropod genera